Carlos Palanca may refer to:

Carlos Palanca (born 1844), Qing dynasty diplomat and Spanish colonial government official
Carlos Palanca (born 1884), founder of the La Tondeña Incorporada distillery and namesake of the Palanca Awards